The Himalayan flameback (Dinopium shorii), also known as the Himalayan goldenback, is a species of bird in the family Picidae. At the moment very little is known of this species and more fieldwork is required. The Himalayan flameback is not threatened but it is suspected that deforestation could severely affect the species population.

Description
The Himalayan flameback is very similar in appearance to the Greater Goldenback (Chrysocolaptes lucidus), but is not at all closely related. The primary difference is its smaller size and bill. The Himalayan flameback can be identified by: their black hind neck, the brownish centre on their throat, that can go down the breast on some and is bordered by an irregular black spotting. They also have an indistinct divided moustachial stripe, the centre of which is brownish and sometimes reddish in males. The Himalayan flameback also has ether reddish or brown eye and three toes. The breast of the Himalayan flameback is irregularly streaked with black but on occasion completely white. Their wings are coppery brown to red in colour.  Lastly the males have a yellowish-red forehead that becomes more red on the crest. In contrast, the female's crest is entirely black streaked with white. In both sexes the crest is bordered by white and black bands on either side of their head.

Taxonomy
Part of the family Picidae and the genus Dinopium which consists of woodpeckers with only three toes, the Himalayan flameback forms a super species with the Common flameback. There are also two recognized sub-species within Himalayan flameback, D.s. shorii and D.s. anguste. The sister species of the Himalayan flameback are Meiglyptes tristis and Celeus brachyurus.

Distribution and habitat

Himalayan Flamebacks are commonly found in the Indian subcontinent, primarily in the lower-to-middle altitudes of the Himalayan sal forest region. Its range spans across Bangladesh, Bhutan, India, Myanmar, and Nepal,  where they are year-round residents. A disjunct population also occurs in south-eastern Ghats. The Himalayan flameback's habitat mainly compromises of mature tropical/subtropical deciduous forests as well as semi-evergreen forests. They prefer lowland Ficus and Bombax forest.

Behaviour

Vocalization
The Himalayan flameback's call is a series of rapidly repeated klak-klak-klak-klak-klak. The call is slower and softer than the Greater Goldenback.

Diet
The diet of Himalayan flamebacks is poorly known. They manly flock and feed together with other birds such as the Greater Goldenback. It is assumed that their primary prey is arthropod insects the same as many other woodpecker species.

Reproduction
Very little know of their breeding habits. What is known is that they breed from March to May and nest in excavated holes in trees. Their clutch size is 2–3 eggs.

References

External links
Vocolizations - xeno-canto
Himalayan flamback video and photos at the Internet Bird Collection

Himalayan flameback
Birds of Bangladesh
Birds of Bhutan
Birds of India
Birds of Myanmar
Birds of Nepal
Himalayan flameback
Taxonomy articles created by Polbot